John "Jack" Guthrie Tait (24 August 1861 – 4 October 1945) V.D. was a Scottish educator who became principal of the Central College of Bangalore prior to the First World War. In his early adulthood, Tait was a notable sportsman playing rugby union as a forward for Cambridge University and represented the Scotland international team twice between 1880 and 1885. As well as being a talented rugby player, Tait was, like his brother Frederick Guthrie Tait, a notable amateur golfer.

Personal history
Tait was born in Edinburgh in 1861, the eldest son of Scottish mathematical physicist Peter Guthrie Tait and Margaret Archer Porter.

He was educated at the Edinburgh Academy from 1871 to 1877 before studying Law at Peterhouse, Cambridge, from 1880. He received his BA in 1884, and on 7 November the same year was admitted at Lincoln's Inn. Tait was called to The Bar on 25 April 1888 and was awarded his MA in 1890.

In 1890 he travelled to India and took up a post in the Government Education Department at Mysore, Karnataka. He became Professor of Languages and vice-principal of Central College of Bangalore, and in 1908 he was made principal of the college.

He was commissioned a Captain in the Bangalore Rifle Volunteers on 31 October 1893. He resigned his commission as a Lieutenant-Colonel 12 July 1917. He was awarded the Volunteer Decoration for his long service.

In 1937 he was elected a Fellow of the Royal Society of Edinburgh. His proposers were D'Arcy Wentworth Thompson, William Peddie, Arthur Crichton Mitchell and Sir Edmund Taylor Whittaker.

In his later life, Tait became a keen student of the works of Sir Walter Scott, and assisted the editors of the centenary edition of the Letters of Sir Walter Scott, and brought out a revised text of The Journal of Sir Walter Scott based on the original manuscript.

He died in Edinburgh in 1945. He is buried next to his parents in the churchyard of St John's Episcopal Church, Edinburgh. The grave lies on the second burial terrace, down from Princes Street on the east side of the church.

Rugby Union career

Amateur career

Tait first came to note as a rugby union player when he represented Edinburgh Academicals.

In 1880, now a freshman at Peterhouse, Tait was selected for the Cambridge University team. At the end of the year Tait was part of the Cambridge team to face Oxford University in the annual Varsity Match, now played at Blackheath. This was Tait's first sporting 'Blue', and the game ended in a respectful draw. Tait missed the 1881 game, but was back in the team for the 1882, led by fellow Peterhouse student Herbert Fuller. The game was won by Oxford, thanks to a clever try scored by Alan Rotherham.

Provincial career

He played for Edinburgh District in their inter-city match against Glasgow District on 20 December 1879.

He then played for East of Scotland District in their match against West of Scotland District on 31 January 1880.

International career

In 1880 he was selected for the Scotland national team, in a Home Nations friendly against Ireland. Scotland were easy victors, winning by three goals to nil; but despite the victory Tait was not part of the Scotland team that faced England for the Calcutta Cup just two weeks later.

Tait played one final notable game, when in 1885 he was called back into the Scotland side, to once again face Ireland, this time as part of the 1885 Home Nations Championship. The game ended in another Scottish victory, but Tait would not represent his country in rugby again.

Golfing career

Tait was a keen golfer, and in his younger days he taught his younger brother, Frederick Guthrie Tait, the basic techniques of the sport. Before leaving for India, Tait entered several amateur golfing tournaments, and in 1887 reached the semi-final stage of the Amateur Championship at Hoylake; being eventually knocked out by John Ball. Although the tutor of his brothers, Frederick would surpass Tait in style and ability, and Frederick's style "...was neater, more finished, more polished, than Jack's (John)."

Results in major championships
Note: Tait played in only The Amateur Championship.

DNP = Did not play
R256, R128, R64, R32, R16, QF, SF = Round in which player lost in match play
Yellow background for top-10

Family

On 7 January 1904 he married Annie Smith Cook, daughter of the Principal of the Central College, John Cook FRSE (d.1915).

His younger brother was Lt Frederick Guthrie Tait.

Bibliography

References

1861 births
1945 deaths
Scottish rugby union players
Scotland international rugby union players
Cambridge University R.U.F.C. players
Rugby union forwards
Rugby union players from Edinburgh
Edinburgh Academicals rugby union players
Scottish male golfers
Amateur golfers
Scottish educators
Scottish Episcopalians
Indian Army personnel of World War I
Indian Defence Force officers
Fellows of the Royal Society of Edinburgh
People educated at Edinburgh Academy
Alumni of Peterhouse, Cambridge
Golfers from Edinburgh
Edinburgh District (rugby union) players
East of Scotland District players